is an interchange railway station in the city of Okazaki, Aichi Prefecture, Japan, jointly operated by Central Japan Railway Company (JR Tōkai) and the Aichi Kanjō Railway (Aikan).

Lines
Okazaki Station is served by the Tōkaidō Main Line, and is located 325.9 kilometers from the starting point of the line at Tokyo Station. It is also the southern terminus of the Aichi Loop Line and is 45.3 kilometers from the northern terminus at Kōzōji Station.

Station layout
The station consists of two island platforms serving 4 tracks, and a side platform with one track. It shared facilities for the Tōkaidō Main Line and the Aichi Loop Line.. The station building has automated ticket machines, TOICA, Manaca, Suica and PASMO automated turnstiles and a staffed ticket office.

Platforms

Adjacent stations

Station history
Okazaki Station was opened September 1, 1888 when the section of the Japanese Government Railways (JGR) line connecting Hamamatsu with Obu was completed. This line was named Tōkaidō Line in 1895, and the Tōkaidō Main Line in 1909. The Nishio Railway began operations to Okazaki Station from October 30, 1911 (later taken over by Meitetsu, operations were discontinued in 1943). In 1930, the first bus system operated by the national government began operations from Okazaki Station. After World War II, the JGR became the Japan National Railway (JNR). A portion of the former Nishio Line was reopened in December 1951 as the "Fukuoka Line", which operated to June 1962. The JNR Okata Line (the forerunner of the Aichi Loop Line) began freight operations in October 1970 and passenger operations in April 1976. However, freight operations were discontinued in January 1984. With the privatization and dissolution of the JNR on April 1, 1987, the station came under the control of the Central Japan Railway Company. A new elevated station building was completed in October 1990.

Station numbering was introduced to the section of the Tōkaidō Line operated JR Central in March 2018; Okazaki Station was assigned station number CA52.

Passenger statistics 
In fiscal 2017, the JR portion of the station was used by an average of 18,138 passengers daily (arriving passengers only) and the Aichi Loop Railway portion by 5,198.

Surrounding area
Okazaki City Hall 
Okazaki Technical High School
Okazaki Minami Junior High School

See also
 List of railway stations in Japan

References
Yoshikawa, Fumio. Tokaido-sen 130-nen no ayumi. Grand-Prix Publishing (2002) .

External links

JR official home page
Aikan home page

Railway stations in Japan opened in 1888
Railway stations in Aichi Prefecture
Tōkaidō Main Line
Stations of Central Japan Railway Company
Okazaki, Aichi